Sven Bernhard Lindqvist (26 March 1903 – 25 January 1987) was a Swedish association football player who won a bronze medal at the 1924 Summer Olympics. During his career with AIK he played 137 matches and scored 4 goals, winning the national title in 1923. In 1950–61 he served as General Manager of the club.

References

1903 births
1987 deaths
Swedish footballers
Footballers at the 1924 Summer Olympics
Olympic footballers of Sweden
Olympic bronze medalists for Sweden
Sweden international footballers
Olympic medalists in football
Association football midfielders
Medalists at the 1924 Summer Olympics
Footballers from Stockholm